The 2022–23 Cornell Big Red women's basketball team represented Cornell University during the 2022–23 NCAA Division I women's basketball season. The Big Red, led by twenty-first-year head coach Dayna Smith, played their home games at Newman Arena and were members of the Ivy League. They finished the season at 10–17, 3–11 to finish in seventh place. The Big Red failed to qualify for the Ivy League women's tournament.

Previous season
Cornell finished the previous season 9–16, 4–10 in Ivy League play to finish in sixth place. They failed to qualify for the 2022 Ivy League women's basketball tournament.

Roster

Schedule

|-
!colspan=9 style=| Non-conference regular season

|-
!colspan=9 style=| Ivy League regular season

See also
 2022–23 Cornell Big Red men's basketball team

References

Cornell Big Red women's basketball seasons
Cornell
Cornell Big Red women's
Cornell Big Red women's